The 2005 BYU Cougars football team represented Brigham Young University during the 2005 NCAA Division I-A football season.

Schedule

•SportsWest Productions (SWP) games were shown locally on KSL 5.

Roster

Game summaries

Boston College

Eastern Illinois

TCU

San Diego State

Source:

New Mexico

Source:

Colorado State

Notre Dame

Source:

Air Force

UNLV

Wyoming

Source:

Utah

Las Vegas Bowl: California

References

BYU
BYU Cougars football seasons
BYU Cougars football